Michael Charles Perry (1933–2015) was an Anglican priest and author.

Perry was born in Ashby de la Zouch on 5 June 1933 and educated at Ashby de la Zouch Boys' Grammar School; Trinity College, Cambridge; and Westcott House, Cambridge. After a curacy in Berkswich he was Chaplain at Ripon College Cuddesdon. He was Chief Assistant for Home Publishing at the SPCK from 1963 until 1970; and Archdeacon of Durham from 1970 to 1993.

He died on 22 January 2015.

References

Archdeacons of Durham
1933 births
2015 deaths
Alumni of Trinity College, Cambridge
Alumni of Westcott House, Cambridge
People from Ashby-de-la-Zouch